James Gaddas (born 17 June 1960) is an English actor best known for his roles in Coronation Street, Bad Girls, Doctors, Emmerdale and Hollyoaks.

Career
Gaddas played Eddie Ainsworth in the tenth episode of the seventh series of Heartbeat. Since leaving Bad Girls, Gaddas has appeared as Jackie Elliot in Billy Elliot the Musical, productions of Peter Pan and Spamalot and Bill Anderson in Mamma Mia! in London. Gaddas has also made appearances on The Bill, Between the Lines, Tracy Beaker Returns, Medics, Dogtown, Doctors, Waterloo Road and in 2015, he acted in Emmerdale, playing Ged, who is a prisoner awaiting trial for murder.

In 2017 he played John in the musical The Girls at the Phoenix Theatre in the West End. In 2020, he joined the cast of the Channel 4 soap opera Hollyoaks as Cormac Ranger.

In September 2021, it was announced that Gaddas would write and star in a new version of Bram Stoker's Dracula. Gaddas will portray 15 characters during the show, which is to tour England in 2022 and include music by Jeremy Swift.

Politics
Gaddas is a member of the Conservative Party and was selected as a candidate for Stockton South in the 2005 UK general election, but finished in second place behind Labour's incumbent Dari Taylor, winning 34.1% of the vote.

Filmography

References

External links
 

Living people
English male television actors
Conservative Party (UK) parliamentary candidates
Actors from County Durham
Actors from Stockton-on-Tees
1960 births